Donovan in Concert is the sixth album from Scottish singer-songwriter Donovan, and the first live album of his career. It was recorded in the Anaheim Convention Center in Anaheim, California on 17 November 1967. It was released in the United States in June 1968 (Epic Records BN 26386 (stereo)) and in the United Kingdom in September 1968 (Pye Records NPL 18237 (monaural) / NSPL 18237 (stereo)). The album reached No.18 on the US charts.

History
This concert was recorded several months before Donovan released A Gift from a Flower to a Garden, and the concert included several songs that would not have been widely known to a US audience, including some which were UK single b-sides. "Poor Cow" is introduced by Donovan as "Poor Love", its original title, which was changed when the song appeared in the film Poor Cow. It retained that title when released as the b-side to "Jennifer Juniper" in February 1968.

The music at the concert was much more subdued than Donovan's singles of the time, and Donovan was backed by the core group of musicians who had recorded with him on his previous albums including flautist Harold McNair and percussionist Tony Carr. They play many genres of music, from folk to jazz. The concert was introduced by (Los Angeles radio station) KRLA radio personality, Rhett Walker, who then hands the proceedings to Donovan's father Donald Leitch.

Reissues
On 15 February 2002 Beat Goes On Records reissued Donovan in Concert (BGOCD 90) on compact disc in the UK.
In 2006 EMI reissued a 2-CD remastered version of the album Donovan in Concert – The Complete 1967 Anaheim Show  (094635410020) in the UK.

Track listing

Original album
Track number, title, length, and on which releases of the studio versions of each song appeared. Songs that were unreleased at the time of the concert are noted with an asterisk (*):

Side one
All tracks by Donovan Leitch.
"Intro" – 3:25
"Isle of Islay"* – 4:21 (from A Gift from a Flower to a Garden, released December 1967)
"Young Girl Blues" – 6:09 (from Mellow Yellow, released March 1967)
"There Is a Mountain" – 3:04 (single, released August 1967)
"Poor Cow"* – 3:28 (b-side of "Jennifer Juniper" single, released February 1968)
"Celeste" – 5:15 (from Sunshine Superman, released September 1966)
"The Fat Angel" – 3:24 (from Sunshine Superman, released September 1966)
"Guinevere" – 2:42 (from Sunshine Superman, released September 1966)

Side two
"Widow with Shawl (A Portrait)"* – 3:34 (from A Gift from a Flower to a Garden, released December 1967)
"Preachin' Love" – 5:03 (b-side of "Mellow Yellow" single, released October 1966)
"The Lullaby of Spring"* – 3:08 (from A Gift from a Flower to a Garden, released December 1967)
"Writer in the Sun" – 4:30 (from Mellow Yellow, released March 1967)
"Pebble and the Man"* – 3:10 (released as "Happiness Runs" on Barabajagal, 11 August 1969)
"Rules and Regulations"* – 2:54 (no studio version released except a demo tape)
"Mellow Yellow" – 4:18 (single, released October 1966)

2006 Reissue

Disc one
 "Intro" – 3:25
 "Isle of Islay" – 4:21  
 "Young Girl Blues" – 6:09
 "There Is a Mountain" – 3:04 
 "Poor Love (Poor Cow)" – 3:28 
 "Sunny Goodge Street" – 3:13
 "Celeste" – 5:15
 "The Fat Angel" – 3:24  
 "Guinevere" – 3:39
 "Widow with Shawl (A Portrait)" – 3:00
 "Epistle to Derroll" – 5:53
 "Preachin' Love" – 9:38

Disc two
 "Lullaby of Spring" – 4:27
 "Sand and Foam" – 3:21
 "Hampstead Incident" – 5:10
 "Writer in the Sun" – 4:11
  "Try for the Sun" – 3:27
 "Someone Singing" – 2:55
 "Pebble and the Man (Happiness Runs)" – 3:10
 "The Tinker and the Crab" – 3:38
 "Rules and Regulations" – 2:33
 "Mellow Yellow" – 4:42
 "Catch the Wind" (part) – 1:16

Personnel

 Donovan – Guitar, Harmonica, Vocals
 Tony Carr – Percussion
 Harold McNair – Flute & sax
 David Troncoso – Bass
 Lorin Newkirk – Piano
 'Candy' John Carr – Bongos & finger cymbals
 and The Flower Quartet

References

External links
 Donovan In Concert – Donovan Unofficial Site

1968 live albums
Donovan live albums
Epic Records live albums
Pye Records live albums
Albums produced by Mickie Most